The 1961 Masters Tournament was the 25th Masters Tournament, held April 6–10 at Augusta National Golf Club in Augusta, Georgia.

Due to heavy rains and flooding of several greens, Sunday's final round was halted before 4 p.m. and the scores were erased, even though ten players had completed their rounds. Third round leader Gary Player was even par through eleven holes, and defending champion Arnold Palmer was two-under through nine. The entire round was replayed the next day.

In the final round on Monday, Player defeated Palmer and amateur Charles Coe by one stroke to become the first international champion at the Masters. Player made an up and down from the bunker on the final hole but thought he had lost the tournament, after carding a disappointing 40 (+4) on the back nine. In the final pairing with a one-shot lead, Palmer needed a par on the final hole for the win. From the fairway, his approach shot also landed in the bunker right of the green. With a poor lie, Palmer's bunker shot went past the hole and off the green and down a hillock. Using his putter from off the green, he failed to get the fourth shot close, then missed the  bogey putt which would have forced a playoff.

It was the first of three green jackets for Player, age 25, and the second of his nine major titles. His other wins at Augusta came over a decade later in 1974 and 1978. Jack Nicklaus, 21, recorded the first of his 22 top-10 finishes at the Masters, his last as an amateur. He tied for seventh, but the low amateur honors went to Coe. Nicklaus regained the U.S. Amateur title in September at Pebble Beach and turned professional in November.

A field of 88 players entered the tournament and 41 of them made the cut at five-over-par (149).

Amateur Deane Beman won the Par 3 contest with a score of 22; he turned pro in 1967 and later became the second commissioner of the PGA Tour, from 1974 to 1994.

Field
1. Masters champions
Jack Burke Jr. (4,8,11), Jimmy Demaret, Doug Ford (4,10,11), Claude Harmon (8), Ben Hogan (2,3,4,8,9), Herman Keiser, Cary Middlecoff (2,11), Byron Nelson (2,4), Arnold Palmer (2,8,9,10), Gene Sarazen (2,3,4), Horton Smith, Sam Snead (3,4,8,10,11), Craig Wood (2)
Ralph Guldahl (2), Henry Picard (4), and Art Wall Jr. (11) did not play.

The following categories only apply to Americans

2. U.S. Open champions
Tommy Bolt (8), Julius Boros (8,9,11), Billy Burke, Billy Casper (8,9), Jack Fleck (9), Ed Furgol, Tony Manero, Lloyd Mangrum, Dick Mayer, Fred McLeod, Sam Parks Jr., Lew Worsham

3. The Open champions
Jock Hutchison (4), Denny Shute (4)

4. PGA champions
Walter Burkemo, Dow Finsterwald (8,9,11), Vic Ghezzi, Chick Harbert, Chandler Harper, Jay Hebert (10,11), Lionel Hebert (8), Johnny Revolta, Bob Rosburg (8,11), Jim Turnesa

5. U.S. Amateur and Amateur champions
Deane Beman (6,7,a), Dick Chapman (a), Charles Coe (6,a), Jack Nicklaus (6,8,9,a), Robert Sweeny Jr. (a)

6. Members of the 1959 U.S. Walker Cup team
William C. Campbell (a), Bill Hyndman (7,a), Chuck Kocsis (a), Billy Joe Patton (8,a), Bud Taylor (8,a), Ward Wettlaufer (a)

Tommy Aaron had turned professional. Campbell and Kocsis were reserves for the team. Harvie Ward did not play.

7. 1960 U.S. Amateur quarter-finalists
John Farquhar (a), Robert W. Gardner (a), Charles Lewis III (a), Steve Spray (a), Claude Wild (a)

8. Top 24 players and ties from the 1960 Masters Tournament
Fred Hawkins, Don January (10), Ted Kroll (9), Mike Souchak (9,11), Ken Venturi

Ed Oliver did not play.

9. Top 16 players and ties from the 1960 U.S. Open
Jerry Barber, George Bayer, Don Cherry (a), Paul Harney, Bob Harris, Dutch Harrison, Johnny Pott

10. Top eight players and ties from 1960 PGA Championship
Wes Ellis, Doug Sanders

Jim Ferrier (4) did not play

11. Members of the U.S. 1959 Ryder Cup team

12. One player, either amateur or professional, not already qualified, selected by a ballot of ex-Masters champions
Gene Littler

13. One professional, not already qualified, selected by a ballot of ex-U.S. Open champions
Bob Goalby

14. One amateur, not already qualified, selected by a ballot of ex-U.S. Amateur champions
Bob Cochran (a)

15. Two players, not already qualified, from a points list based on finishes in the winter part of the 1961 PGA Tour
Bill Collins, Mason Rudolph

16. Foreign invitations
Keith Alexander (a), Al Balding, Phil Brownlee (a), Antonio Cerdá, Bruce Crampton (8), Roberto De Vicenzo, Mário Gonzalez, Bill Kerr, Stan Leonard (8), Sebastián Miguel, Ángel Miguel, Kel Nagle (3), Gary Player (3,8), Chi-Chi Rodríguez, Miguel Sala, Peter Thomson (3)

Numbers in brackets indicate categories that the player would have qualified under had they been American.

Round summaries

First round
Thursday, April 6, 1961

Source

Second round
Friday, April 7, 1961

Source

Third round
Saturday, April 8, 1961

Source:

Final round
Sunday, April 9, 1961
Monday, April 10, 1961

Summary
Play on Sunday was washed out due to heavy rain and wind shortly after 4 pm and all scores were erased; the final round was replayed on Monday. Although Player was the leader after 54 holes, he finished his round nearly an hour ahead of Palmer's double-bogey at the final hole.

Final leaderboard

Sources:

Scorecard

Cumulative tournament scores, relative to par
{|class="wikitable" span = 50 style="font-size:85%;
|-
|style="background: Pink;" width=10|
|Birdie
|style="background: PaleGreen;" width=10|
|Bogey
|style="background: Green;" width=10|
|Double bogey
|}

References

External links
Masters.com – Past winners and results
Augusta.com – 1961 Masters leaderboard and scorecards

1961
1961 in golf
1961 in American sports
1961 in sports in Georgia (U.S. state)
April 1961 sports events in the United States